Bryum warneum, known as sea bryum or Warne's threadmoss, is a protected moss found in sandy coastal areas in temperate regions of Europe (including Iceland) and is also recorded to have been found in the Himalaya, the Altai Mountains and in Quebec, Canada.

Generally forming dense clusters of plants with one-centimetre stems with small, hanging capsules in which spores are produced and, upon maturity, emitted.

References

warneum
Flora of Europe
Bryophyta of North America